The California League is a Minor League Baseball league that operates in California. Having been classified at various levels throughout its existence, it operated at Class A-Advanced from 1990 until its demotion to Single-A following Major League Baseball's 2021 reorganization of the minor leagues. The league temporarily operated for the 2021 season as the Low-A West before reassuming its original moniker in 2022.

Before the COVID-19 pandemic, league attendance continued to increase each season, with over one million fans attending games per year, part of a general nationwide growth and expansion to smaller towns, cities, and regions below those in the National League or American League with Minor League Baseball at various levels of play in growing popularity in the last few decades.

History
There were various attempts in the late 1800s and early 1900s to form a "California League" on the West Coast, considering the distance of the two current major leagues which generally had teams only in the Northeast and were restricted at first until World War I by long-distance train travel. The first organized California League lasted from 1887 to 1889, then another followed in 1891, and 1893, and finally in 1899–1902. After the National Association of Professional Baseball Leagues, an organization of minor leagues was formed in 1902, (following the "truce" and agreements  between the older National League of 1876 and the newly "upstart" American League of 1901), the California League operated outside the NAPBL system as an independent league in 1902 and again from 1907 to 1909. This led to huge differences in the quality of teams competing with each other. In 1907, the San Francisco team was 3–34, while later in 1908 San Francisco was 9–67 and Oakland was 4–71. Oakland and San Francisco competed in every year of these various state leagues, with San Francisco having two teams during 1887–88.

The latest version of the California League  was founded in 1941, and included teams in Anaheim, Bakersfield, Fresno, Merced, Riverside, San Bernardino, Santa Barbara, and Stockton. The following year, as a result of World War II, the league dropped to four teams, then ceased and suspended operations altogether, although major league baseball and some minor leagues continued as much as possible with limited availability of players during the war years. It reorganized and came back in 1946, adding teams in Visalia, San Jose, and Ventura by 1947. Further east, Reno, Nevada joined the league in 1955 with the movement of the old Channel Cities Oilers in Santa Barbara and continued as a member for 37 years.

Though nicknames and affiliations shifted, the California League's postwar configuration was largely stable by the late 1950s; four of the six cities in the league in 1960 would still be part of the league 50 years later. The league reached eight clubs in 1966 and would hold that for ten years, briefly dipped to six before wavering between eight and nine clubs in the early eighties, then reached ten in 1986 and held that configuration for thirty-one seasons. From 1996 to 2016, the league had a remarkably stable alignment for Class A baseball, with no teams moving or folding for twenty-one years. After the 2016 season, the Bakersfield Blaze, long dogged by inadequate facilities and unable to negotiate significant repairs, and the High Desert Mavericks, suffering from falling attendance and a lease dispute with the city of Adelanto, were folded; the High-A level replaced them by expanding the Carolina League to ten teams.

The start of the 2020 season was postponed due to the COVID-19 pandemic before ultimately being cancelled on June 30. As part of Major League Baseball's 2021 reorganization of the minor leagues, the California League was demoted to Low-A and temporarily renamed the "Low-A West" for the 2021 season. Following MLB's acquisition of the rights to the names of the historical minor leagues, the Low-A West was renamed the California League and reclassified as a Single-A league effective with the 2022 season.

Current teams

League champions 
Year by Year list of league champions:

Complete team list (1941–1942, 1946–present) 

Anaheim Aces: 1941
Bakersfield Badgers: 1941–1942
Bakersfield Bears: 1957–1967
Bakersfield Blaze: 1995–2016
Bakersfield Boosters: 1956
Bakersfield Indians: 1946–1955
Bakersfield Boosters: 1956
Bakersfield Dodgers: 1968–1975; 1984–1994
Bakersfield Mariners: 1982–1983
Bakersfield Outlaws: 1978–1979
Central Valley Rockies: 1993–1994
Channel Cities Oilers: 1954–1955
Fresno Cardinals: 1941–1942
Fresno Giants: 1958–1987
Fresno Grizzlies: 2021–present
Fresno Suns: 1988
Fresno SunSox: 1957
High Desert Mavericks: 1991–2016
Inland Empire 66ers: 2003-present
Lake Elsinore Storm: 1994–present
Lancaster JetHawks: 1996–2020
Las Vegas Wranglers: 1958
Lodi Crushers: 1966–1969; 1984
Lodi Dodgers: 1976–1983
Lodi Orioles: 1974–1975
Lodi Orions: 1972
Lodi Padres: 1970–1971
Merced Bears: 1941
Modesto A's: 1975–2004
Modesto Colts: 1962–1964
Modesto Nuts: 2005–present
Modesto Reds: 1946–1961; 1966–1974
Mudville Nine: 2000–2001
Palm Springs Angels: 1986–1993
Rancho Cucamonga Quakes: 1993–present
Redwood Pioneers: 1980–1985
Reno Padres: 1982–1987
Reno Silver Sox: 1955–1964; 1966–1981; 1988–1992
Riverside Pilots: 1993–1995
Riverside Reds: 1941
Riverside Red Wave: 1988–1990
Salinas Angels: 1976–1980
Salinas Packers: 1954–1958; 1973–1975
Salinas Indians: 1965
Salinas Mets: 1963–1964
Salinas Packers: 1954–1958; 1973–1975
Salinas Spurs: 1982–1987; 1989–1992
San Bernardino Stampede: 1996–2002
San Bernardino Stars: 1941
San Bernardino Spirit: 1987–1995
San Jose Bees: 1962–1976; 1983–1987
San Jose Expos: 1982
San Jose Giants: 1988–present
San Jose JoSox: 1956–1957
San Jose Missions: 1979–1981
San Jose Owls: 1942
San Jose Pirates: 1958 
San Jose Red Sox: 1946–1953
Santa Barbara Dodgers: 1947–1953; 1964–1967
Santa Barbara Rancheros: 1962–1963
Santa Barbara Saints: 1941–1942
Santa Clara Padres: 1979
Stockton Flyers: 1941
Stockton Mariners: 1978
Stockton Ports: 1946–1972; 1979–1999; 2002–present
Ventura Braves: 1950–1952
Ventura County Gulls: 1985–1986
Ventura Oilers: 1953
Ventura Yankees: 1947–1949
Visalia A's 1960–1961
Visalia Cubs: 1946–1952; 1954–1956
Visalia Mets: 1968–1975
Visalia Rawhide: 2009–present
Visalia Redlegs: 1957–1959 
Visalia Oaks: 1977–1992; 1995–2008
Visalia Stars: 1953
Visalia White Sox: 1962

The Los Angeles area, Riverside, San Bernardino, Palm Springs, Yuma (AZ) and Las Vegas (NV) were also major league spring training site cities, as well possessed California League teams on different occasions.

Cities that have had California League teams

Adelanto (1991–2016)
Anaheim (1941)
Atwater (1960s)
Bakersfield (1941–42, 1946–1975, 1978–79, 1982–2016)
Fresno (1941–42, 1946–1988, 2021–present)
Lake Elsinore (1994–present)
Lancaster (1996–2020)
Las Vegas, Nevada (1958)
Lodi (1966–1984)
Merced (1941)
Modesto (1946–1964, 1966–present)
Palm Springs (1986–1993)
Rancho Cucamonga (1993–present)
Reno, Nevada (1955–1964, 1966–1992) 
Riverside (1941, 1988–1990, 1993–1995)
Rohnert Park (1980–1985)
Salinas (1954–1958, 1963–1965, 1973–1980, 1982–1987, 1989–1992)
San Bernardino (1941, 1987–present)
San Jose (1942, 1947–1958, 1962–1976, 1979–present)
Santa Barbara (1941–42, 1946–1953, 1962–1967)
Santa Clara (1979)
Stockton (1941, 1946–1972, 1978–present)
Ventura (1947–1955, 1986)
Visalia (1946–1962, 1968–1975, 1977–present)

Modesto has hosted a California League team longer than any other city, hosting a team in all but two of the CL's 65 seasons.

League timeline

Team list (prior incarnations)

1906–1909

Alameda Grays/Alameda Encinals 1906–1908
Fresno Tigers/Fresno Raisin Growers 1908–09
Oakland Commuters 1906–1909
Sacramento Cordovas/Sacramento Senators 1906–1908
San Francisco Orphans 1906–1909
San Jose Prune Pickers 1906–1909
Santa Cruz Sand Crabs 1908–09
Stockton Millers 1906–1909

1896, 1898–1902

California of San Francisco 1896
Fresno 1898
Imperials of San Francisco 1896
Los Angeles Angels 1901–02
Oakland 1896
Oakland Reliance/Oaks/Commuters/Clamdiggers 1898–1902
Sacramento Gilt Edges 1899–1902
San Francisco Metropolitans 1896, 1898
San Francisco A's 1899
San Jose 1896, 1898
San Jose Brewers/San Francisco Brewers 1899–1900
San Francisco 1902
Santa Cruz Sand Crabs 1899
Stockton 1896, 1898
Stockton Wasps/San Francisco Wasps 1900–1901
Watsonville Hayseeds 1899

1879–1893

Los Angeles Seraphs/Los Angeles Angels 1892–1893
Oakland Colonels 1889–1893
Oakland Greenhood & Morans 1886–1888
Oakland Pioneers 1879
Sacramento Altas 1886–1887, 1889
Sacramento Senators 1890–1891
San Francisco 1880, 1884–1885
San Francisco Athletics 1879–1881
San Francisco Bay City 1880
San Francisco Californias 1879–1880, 1882–1883
San Francisco Friscos/Metropolitans 1891–1893
San Francisco Haverlys 1883–1890
San Francisco Knickerbockers 1881
San Francisco Nationals 1882
San Francisco Mutuals 1879
San Francisco Niantic 1883
San Francisco Occidental 1884–1885
San Francisco Pioneers 1886–1888
San Francisco Reddingtons 1883
San Francisco Reno 1881–82
San Francisco Star 1884–1886
San Jose Dukes 1891–1892
Stockton 1888–1890
Stockton River Pirates/Sacramento Senators 1893

California League Hall of Fame

The California League inducted its first class of 15 inductees into its Hall of Fame in 2016.

Awards

Most Valuable Player

The California League Most Valuable Player Award was established in 1941.

Pitcher of the Year
For award winners, see footnote

Rookie of the Year
For award winners, see footnote

Manager of the Year
For award winners, see footnote

Doug Harvey Award
The Doug Harvey Award—established in 2010—is for the umpire of the year.

See also

Notes

References

External links

 
Minor baseball leagues in the United States
Baseball leagues in California
Sports leagues established in 1941
1941 establishments in California
Professional sports leagues in the United States